Fernando Ortiz Fernández (born 4 July 1992) is a Mexican professional footballer who plays in the forward position. He is currently playing for Cimarrones de Sonora.

References

External links
 

1992 births
Living people
Mexican footballers
Association football forwards
Bravos de Nuevo Laredo footballers
Atlético Reynosa footballers
Atlético Morelia players
Monarcas Morelia Premier players
Cimarrones de Sonora players
Liga MX players
Ascenso MX players
Liga Premier de México players
Tercera División de México players
Footballers from Michoacán
Sportspeople from Morelia